Holcombe is a surname, originating in a number of English villages with the name. Early examples are recorded as de Holcombe, and the final e has been dropped from many family names. Notable people with the surname Holcombe (with an e) include:

Alex Holcombe (born 1969), American basketball player
Brett Holcombe, Australian paralympic athlete
Brian Holcombe (born 1941), former Australian Rules footballer
Carven Holcombe (born 1964), American basketball player
Ken Holcombe (born 1918), Major League Baseball pitcher
Randall G. Holcombe (born 1950), American economist

See also
Holcomb (surname)

English toponymic surnames
English-language surnames